Partners  is a 1982 American gay-themed buddy comedy film directed by James Burrows and starring Ryan O'Neal and John Hurt as a mismatched pair of cops.

Plot
After a series of murders in Los Angeles's gay community, heterosexual police officer Sgt. Benson (Ryan O'Neal) is assigned to go undercover as half of a gay couple with Officer Kerwin (John Hurt), a Records Clerk. Kerwin naively believes that he is closeted, although the entire Department knows about his sexual identity. The pair discover an earlier murder and learn that both victims appeared in the same gay magazine. Each had received a call from a hoarse-voiced man asking them to model for him, only to turn up dead soon after. Benson models for the magazine and is approached by the same hoarse-voiced man; but, when another model turns up dead, the man is cleared as a suspect.

Benson grows close to Jill (Robyn Douglass), the photographer of his shoot, and plans a weekend getaway with her. Kerwin suspects her of the murders, but his superiors put it down to jealousy. Kerwin uncovers evidence implicating Jill; but, when the police move to apprehend her, they discover her corpse. Her death unknown to Benson, he arrives for his rendezvous with Jill; and Kerwin races to his aid. Jill's killer, a closeted man whom Jill and one of the victims were blackmailing, admits to Benson that he killed Jill and two of the men but insists that Jill killed her partner in crime. Realizing that Kerwin is outside, the killer shoots at Kerwin who returns fire. Kerwin is wounded, but the other man is killed.

Cast
 Ryan O'Neal as Sgt. Benson
 John Hurt as Kerwin
 Kenneth McMillan as Chief Wilkins
 Robyn Douglass as Jill
 Jay Robinson as Halderstam
 Denise Galik as Clara
 Joseph R. Sicari as Walter
 Michael McGuire as Monroe
 Rick Jason as Douglas
 James Remar as Edward K. Petersen
 Jennifer Ashley as Secretary
 Darrell Larson as Al
 Tony March as Aide #2
 Seamon Glass as Gillis
 Steven Reisch as Counter Boy

Production
Veber wrote the film in Paris, with little knowledge of the gay scene in Los Angeles. Veber wanted to do it because "it seemed to me it could be amusing and I wanted to do something quite different from Cruising which seemed to me to be a really bad eye on the gay world.

"It's a comedy," said producer Russo. "It's a comedy that comes out of real situations, out of the tradition of French farce. I felt for both characters."

The leading roles were originally offered to Clint Eastwood and Woody Allen. Eastwood expressed interest if Allen signed, but Allen declined.

The film was one of six relatively low budgeted films rushed into production by Paramount Pictures in 1981 prior to an impending director strike, with budgets between $4–8 million. Paramount were interested to see what the results would be like on films with a shortened pre-production process. The other films were Some Kind of Hero, Jekyll and Hyde... Together Again, I'm Dancing as Fast as I Can, White Dog and An Officer and a Gentleman. A seventh film, Young Lust, was "picked up" from another production company. Partners was championed within the studio by Don Simpson (Michael Eisner, also at the studio, said that he "hated" the script.). Of all the seven films, Paramount executives were most enthusiastic about the script for Partners.

In the original script and cut of the film Hurt's character commits suicide "because his life was so sad," said Veber. "We shot the scene but when people saw the film they had grown to like Hurt so much that by the point that the suicide came as too much of a shock, so we took it out. In France it would have been quite acceptable. I found that interesting."

Soundtrack

Partners: Music from the Motion Picture Composed and Conducted by Georges Delerue is a 1.000 Units Limited Edition soundtrack album from the film of the same name, released on March 20, 2014, by Spanish label Quartet Records. The album, released on CD, contains 21 tracks composed and conducted by Georges Delerue, plus 3 bonus tracks.

Critic James Southall describes the soundtrack as "typical of [Delerue's] work on American movies at the time – light, airy, wonderfully tuneful and very enjoyable", and concluded that it was "never unappealing."

Track listing 
All music arranged and conducted by Georges Delerue. All music composed by Georges Delerue, except bonus tracks.

Reception
Rex Reed, writing for the New York Post, panned the film, saying, "Hollywood's latest crime against humanity in general and homosexuals in particular is a dumb creepshow called Partners – stupid, tasteless and homophobic, this sleazy, superficial film implies that gay cops can't be trusted to work with straight cops because they might fall in love with them." Gene Siskel was also offended and later called it one of the worst films of 1982. O'Neal was nominated for a Golden Raspberry Award as Worst Actor of the Decade.

When asked if the film drew any complaints from gay men during filming, John Hurt said, "They didn't like it that I was wearing a lilac-colored track suit in it.  They say homosexuals do not necessarily do that.  And the person who's saying this is sitting there in a pink track suit, It's a crazy world we live in."

The film was a financial failure. Head of Paramount Barry Diller later said "Partners was the essence of a badly made movie, partly because it was rushed against a date."

References

External links
 
 
 
 
 Partners at The Numbers

1982 films
1980s buddy comedy films
1980s crime comedy films
1980s buddy cop films
1982 LGBT-related films
1980s comedy mystery films
American buddy comedy films
American LGBT-related films
American comedy mystery films
1980s English-language films
Fictional portrayals of the Los Angeles Police Department
Films about murder
Films directed by James Burrows
Films scored by Georges Delerue
Films set in Los Angeles
Gay-related films
LGBT-related buddy comedy films
Paramount Pictures films
1980s police comedy films
1982 comedy films
1982 directorial debut films
1980s American films
Films with screenplays by Francis Veber